The Dominica national under-16 basketball team is a national basketball team of Dominica, administered by the Dominica Amateur Basketball Association.

It represents the country in international under-16 (under age 16) basketball competitions.

It appeared at the 2016 CBC U16 Championship.

See also
Dominica men's national basketball team

References

External links
Archived records of Dominica team participations

Basketball teams in Dominica
Men's national under-16 basketball teams
Basketball